Summary may refer to:
 Abstract (summary), shortening a passage or a write-up without changing its meaning but by using different words and sentences
 Epitome, a summary or miniature form
 Abridgement, the act of reducing a written work into a shorter form
 Summary or executive summary of a document, a short document or section that summarizes a longer document such as a report or proposal or a group of related reports
 Introduction (writing)
 Summary (law), which has several meanings in law
 Automatic summarization, the use of a computer program to produce an abstract or abridgement

See also 
 Overview (disambiguation)
 Recap (disambiguation)
 Synopsis (disambiguation)